Women on the Run (Czech title Ženy v běhu) is a 2019 Czech comedy film directed by Martin Horský. The film became the most successful Czech directorial debut when it was viewed by more than 1 million people after 42 days. The film eventually grossed 200 million CZK becoming the highest-grossing Czech film.

Cast
 Zlata Adamovská as Věra
 Tereza Kostková as Marcela
 Veronika Khek Kubařová as Bára
 Jenovéfa Boková as Kačka
 Ondřej Vetchý as Karel
 Vladimír Polívka as Vojta
 Martin Hofmann as Josef
 Samuel Gyertyák as 
 Michaela Sodomková as 
 David Kraus as Jirka
 Bolek Polívka as Jindřich

References

External links
 

2019 films
Czech comedy films
2010s Czech-language films
2019 comedy films